The London Film Critics Circle Award for Supporting Actress of the Year is an annual award given by the London Film Critics Circle.

Winners

2010s

2020s

References

Film awards for supporting actress
A